Clavulina nigricans is a species of coral fungus in the family Clavulinaceae. It is found only in Guyana.

References

External links

Fungi described in 2004
Fungi of Guyana
nigricans